A hand web piercing is a piercing through the web of the hand (Interdigital Fold) between two digits, such as between the fore-finger and middle-finger or fore-finger and thumb. This piercing has a high rate of rejection because of the nature of the tissue and how dynamic or mobile the area is.  This piercing is not commonly performed by reputable professionals because of its low success rate. Typical body jewelry used is a barbell or a captive bead ring.

Another type of hand piercing is across the top of the finger. 

The healing can take anywhere from 6 weeks to 1 year.

Surface piercings

de:Oberflächenpiercing#Handweb